D. Austin Henderson is a Canadian computer scientist who pioneered work in email, 
virtual desktops, computer-supported collaboration, and human computer interaction.

He chaired one of the first SIGCHI CHI conferences in 1985.

He was chair of ACM SIGCHI, the special interest group in computer-human interaction from 1991 to 1993
 
He is an inductee of the CHI Academy.

References

External links
Austin Henderson's home page

Human–computer interaction researchers
Living people
Year of birth missing (living people)